Bardeh Rash is a village in Nameh Shir Rural District, Namshir District, Baneh County, Kurdistan Province, Iran. At the 2006 census, its population was 558, in 102 families. The village is populated by Kurds.

References

Towns and villages in Baneh County
Kurdish settlements in Kurdistan Province